Gokor may refer to:

Gokor Chivichyan
Gokor from Richard Elfman's Streets of Rage (1994)